Shuhan-e Olya or Showhan-e Olya may refer to:
 Shuhan-e Olya, Kermanshah
 Shuhan-e Olya, Khuzestan